This is a list of properties and districts in Miller County, Georgia that are listed on the National Register of Historic Places (NRHP).

Current listings

|}

References

Miller
Buildings and structures in Miller County, Georgia